Russian Black Sea Coast formerly known before the Circassian genocide as Circassian coast is the coast of historical Circassia on the Black Sea, extending from Anapa in the North to Adler in the south, and including cities like Tuapse and Sochi.

The coastline was ceded to Russia in 1829 as a result of the Caucasian War and the Russo-Turkish War, However, in 1828 the Circassians did not admit Russian control over Circassia because Circassia was not considered a part of the Ottoman Empire, instead insisting Circassia is independent. Thus, they kept resisting the newly established Russian outposts along the Coast and the inner lands in the Russian–Circassian War.

Provision of weapons and ammunition from abroad to the Circassians caused a diplomatic conflict between the Russian Empire and Great Britain in 1836, which is referred to as the Mission of the Vixen.

References

Circassians
Geography of North Caucasus
Coasts of the Black Sea
Coasts of Russia